The Fatal Hour (also known as The Clock) is a 1937 British drama film directed by George Pearson and starring Edward Rigby, Moira Reed and Moore Marriott. It was the final film of the director George Pearson, who had been a leading figure during the silent era, and was made at Pinewood Studios.

Cast
 Edward Rigby as Cready  
 Moira Reed as Mary Denston  
 Moore Marriott as Dixon  
 Dick Hunter as Peter  
 Derek Gorst as James West  
 D.J. Williams as Evangelist  
 J.R. Lockwood as Sir George Bell  
 Ernest Sefton as Pat 
 Cyril Hillier
 Douglas Vine

References

Bibliography
 Low, Rachael. Filmmaking in 1930s Britain. George Allen & Unwin, 1985.
 Wood, Linda. British Films, 1927-1939. British Film Institute, 1986.

External links
 

1937 films
1930s English-language films
1937 drama films
British drama films
Films shot at Pinewood Studios
Films set in England
Films based on British novels
Paramount Pictures films
British black-and-white films
British and Dominions Studios films
1930s British films